Wiremu Netana Panapa  (1898–1970) was a New Zealand Anglican Suffragan Bishop in the second half of the 20th century.

He was born on 7 June 1898, educated at St John's College, Auckland and ordained in 1921. After curacies in the Diocese of Auckland he was its  Māori Diocesan Missioner. 

In 1937 he was a selector for the New Zealand Māori rugby league team along with Jim Rukutai, and Ernie Asher.

During World War II he was a Chaplain to the New Zealand Forces. When peace returned he held incumbencies in Rotorua and Taupō before being appointed Suffragan Bishop of Aotearoa in 1951. In the 1954 New Year Honours, Panapa was appointed a Commander of the Order of the British Empire. He retired in 1967 (before 29 October) and died on 10 June 1970.

Notes

1898 births
New Zealand Commanders of the Order of the British Empire
Anglican bishops of Aotearoa
1970 deaths
New Zealand military chaplains
World War II chaplains
20th-century Anglican bishops in New Zealand
New Zealand military personnel of World War II
New Zealand Māori people